Red Digital Cinema (Red Digital Cinema Camera Company) is an American company that manufactures professional digital cinematography cameras and accessories.

The company's headquarters is in Foothill Ranch, California, with studios in Hollywood, California. It has offices in London, Shanghai, and Singapore, retail stores in Hollywood, New York City, and Miami, as well as various authorized resellers and service centers around the world.

History
Red Digital Cinema was founded by Jim Jannard, who had previously founded Oakley. As a self-described "camera fanatic" owning over 1,000 models, Jannard started the company with the intent to deliver a (relatively) affordable 4K digital cinema camera. Jannard dates this idea to a time when he bought a Sony HDR-FX1 video camera and learned that the files had to be converted with software from Lumiere HD and were not viewable on Mac OS. Lumiere HD's owner Frederic Lumiere collaborated with Jannard on developing an alternative and introduced him to Ted Schilowitz who became Red's first employee.

The early team members engaged in undisclosed research on how to make a digital camera feasible for Hollywood productions. Part of this involved using 4K resolution instead of 2K which was most common at the time. Another technical hurdle was to achieve the focusing quality of DSLR cameras without sacrificing frame rate. Part of Red's solution to this problem was developing a sensor with a physical size comparable to that of analog film. At the 2006 NAB Show, Jannard announced that Red would build a 4K digital cinema camera, called the Red One, and began taking pre-orders.

In March 2007, director Peter Jackson completed a camera test of two prototype Red One cameras, which became the 12-minute World War I film Crossing the Line.  On seeing the short film, director Steven Soderbergh told Jannard: "I am all in. I have to shoot with this."  Soderbergh took two prototype Red Ones into the jungle to shoot his film, Che.  A short documentary, Che and the Digital Revolution was made about the Red camera technology that was used in the film's production. The Red One first shipped in August 2007. One of the first television programs to shoot with it was the medical drama ER.

In 2010, Red acquired the historic Ren-Mar Studios in Hollywood, and renamed it "Red Studios Hollywood". By 2011, it had over 400 employees. 2011 was also the year in which Panavision, Arri and Aaton announced that they would no longer be producing analog cameras. Red Digital Cinema and the Red One were widely credited as accelerating this transition in the industry. Schilowitz responded to these reviews by saying "It was never our goal to kill film. Instead, we wanted to evolve it."

On August 19, 2013, Jim Jannard announced his retirement from RED, leaving Jarred Land the current president to take over in his absence.

In 2010, 5% of the top 100 grossing domestic films that were shot on digital video used Red cameras as their primary system. Their share increased to over 25% by 2016, but has declined since then.

Cameras

Red One
The Red One first introduced in 2007 was Red Digital Cinema's first production camera. It captures up to 120 frames per second at 2K resolution and 60 frames per second at 4K resolution. Its "Mysterium" sensor was acquisitioned for use with the proprietary RAW format called Redcode. By 2010, Red began selling upgrades to a 14 megapixel sensor called the "M-X". The Red One has been reviewed as having effectively the same quality as 35mm film. The Red One was made out of aluminum alloy, and the body alone weighs 10 lbs (4.5 kg).

It was used to shoot Wanted, Che, The Informant, and The Girl with the Dragon Tattoo.  In 2010, Red released the Red Epic, which was used to shoot The Amazing Spider-Man, The Hobbit, Prometheus, Pirates of the Caribbean: On Stranger Tides, The Great Gatsby and Beast as well as many other feature films.

DSMC system
In 2009, Red began releasing new cameras with an updated form factor compared to the Red One. Designed with the goal of facilitating either still images or video, depending on the mounting setup, Red called the concept DSMC for "Digital Stills and Motion Capture". The first camera released for this system was Epic-X, a professional digital stills and motion capture camera with interchangeable lens mounts. After this a new camera line called Scarlet was introduced that provided lower end specifications at a more affordable price. Initially equipped with a 5K imaging sensor, upgrades were later offered to a 6K sensor with higher dynamic range called the "Red Dragon".

DSMC2 system

The DSMC2 family of cameras was introduced in 2015 as the new form factor for all cameras up to 2020. The Weapon 8K VV and Weapon 6K were the first two cameras announced within this line. They were followed by the Red Raven 4.5K and Scarlet-W 5K. Third-party capture formats, namely Apple ProRes and Avid DNxHD, were made available for these cameras.

In 2016, an 8K sensor called "Helium" was introduced with the two cameras Red Epic-W and Weapon 8K S35. In early January 2017, this was given the highest sensor score ever, 108, by the DxOMark website. Marvel Studios' Guardians of the Galaxy Vol. 2 was the first film to be released that was shot on the Weapon. The film was shot at the camera's full 8K resolution, and featured an equivalent workflow, supplanting director David Fincher's Gone Girl as the film with the highest-resolution post-production workflow.

DSMC3 System 
In 2019, Jared Land from Red announced the Red Komodo camera. In 2020, Red started to ship the "beta" stormtrooper white models of the Red Komodo to customers on the waitlist. The price for the beta cameras is $6995, with the regular black shipping models for $5,995 (body only). The Komodo camera features 6K video, super 35 sensor, a Canon RF lens mount, a dual BP battery plate, and a global shutter.

In 2021, Red announced the Red V-Raptor camera, the current flagship model in Red’s lineup of cameras, and the first camera that officially belongs to the DSMC3 family of cameras. Like the Komodo, the Red V-Raptor also has an active Canon RF lens mount, but unlike the Komodo, the V-Raptor is capable of multi-format recording.

Live Production states, “V-RAPTOR features a multi-format 8K sensor (40.96mm x 21.60mm) with the ability to shoot 8K large format or 6K Super 35. Joining its predecessor, the MONSTRO 8K VV sensor, this unique in-camera option for impactful visual storytelling allows shooters to leverage any of their large format or S35 lenses with the push of a button and always deliver at over 4K resolution. The V-RAPTOR far exceeds previous sensor capabilities, presenting users with the option to capture 8K full sensor at up to 120 frames per second (150fps at 2.4:1), 6K up to 160 fps (200fps at 2.4:1), and 2K (2.4:1) at an incredible 600 frames per second, while still capturing over 17 stops of dynamic range.”

The Red V-Raptor launched with a price tag of $24,500 (body only) and is available for purchase on their website as well as from a few other vendors.

Later in 2021, Red announced on their website that the Red V-Raptor XL would be released in 2022. The upcoming camera will be priced at $39,500 (likely body only) and will feature an “all-in one system, suited for studio configurations and high-end productions. Includes internal ND filter, additional aux power, interchangeable lens mount, and more.”

Other products

Lenses

Red offered S35 PL mount prime and zoom lenses for their cameras.

Primes

Zooms

Hydrogen One modular smartphone system 
In 2017, Red announced their intentions to enter the smartphone market including planned features such as a 5.7" holographic display and integration with existing camera products. On May 18, 2018, Red announced the Hydrogen One, with a release date in August 2018. Promised features included a holographic display, spatial sound, compatibility with the Red camera program, the launch of a streaming service, and modular add-ons similar to the "Moto Mods" feature of Motorola's Moto Z. Especially the announced camera sensor module received attention, with RED founder Jannard claiming: "If you were shooting an 8K Weapon on set as your A camera, this could certainly be your B camera."

On release, the smartphone was a critical disappointment and was even cited as a contender for the worst technology product of 2018, arising from outdated hardware and a lack of capabilities. Similarly, the phone was a commercial flop, and in 2019, promised modular add-ons vanished from Red's website, with Jannard announcing the company was  "currently in the middle of radically changing the Hydrogen program". In late 2019, the company discontinued the product line.

Software 
Red began selling its Redcine-X package for post-production workflow in 2009. The process of decompressing the sensor data can be sped up with a Red Rocket accelerator card. There is a downloadable SDK for working directly with the Redcode images, and another for controlling the cameras remotely.

Redray
Announced in 2012, the Redray Player was the first stand-alone device capable of providing 4K content to compatible 2D or 3D displays. Using a 1TB internal drive for storage, the Redray plays 4K or HD media in the Redcode format. The player uses 12-bit 4:2:2 precision. A cinema laser projector in the same family was also announced in 2012 but never released.

Lawsuits
On August 18, 2008, Red filed a lawsuit against the electronics company LG over its use of the name Scarlet. Red accused LG "... of taking the 'Scarlet' brand name from the camera company" after Red had denied LG's request to use it.

On September 23, 2011, Jannard announced that his personal email account was compromised by former Arri executive Michael Bravin. A lawsuit against Arri and Bravin was filed at the end of 2011, and settled and dismissed in 2013.

On June 27, 2012, Red sued Wooden Camera, a manufacturer of third party accessories, for patent infringement.

In February 2013, Red filed for an injunction against Sony, claiming that several of its new CineAlta products, particularly the 4K-capable F65, infringed on patents the company held. They requested that Sony not only be forced to stop selling the cameras, but that they be destroyed as well. Sony filed a countersuit against Red in April 2013, alleging that Red's entire product line infringed on Sony patents. In July 2013, both parties filed jointly for dismissal, and as of July 20, 2013, the case is closed.

On March 2, 2017, Red filed a lawsuit against the maker of JinniMag, a third party copy of the Red Mini Mag. Videos posted on the Jinni.Tech YouTube channel have accused Red Digital Cinema Cameras of lying to their customers and possibly obtaining their patents by deceiving the USPTO.

In May 2019, Apple Inc. filed a lawsuit against Red.com, LLC over several patents relating to digital cinema cameras and sensor processing. Apple lost the case in November 2019. Apple argued that the patents related to REDCODE RAW were “Unpatentable”, but the judge ruled that Apple's legal team had not provided sufficient evidence to back up their claims.

See also
 List of large sensor interchangeable-lens video cameras
 List of Red Digital Cinema cameras

References

External links

 
 Red Camera 2012 [2006]. on the Movie Making Manual at WikiBooks
 
 

2005 establishments in California
American companies established in 2005
Cinematography
Companies based in Lake Forest, California
Digital movie cameras
Manufacturing companies based in Greater Los Angeles
Manufacturing companies established in 2005
Movie camera manufacturers
Privately held companies based in California
Canon RF-mount cameras